Lorentz Aspen (born 23 April 1978 in Stavanger) is a Norwegian heavy metal pianist and keyboardist. He played in Theatre of Tragedy from 2 October 1993 to 2 October 2010 and with them he released seven studio albums, one live album and five EP's. He also played in Imperium as an additional musician, and he played the hammond organ on Therion's Vovin.

Discography

With Theatre of Tragedy
Theatre of Tragedy - Demo (1994)
Theatre of Tragedy (1995)
Velvet Darkness They Fear (1996)
A Rose for the Dead - EP (1997)
Aégis (1998)
Musique (2000)
Closure: Live - Live (2001)
Inperspective - Compilation EP (2001)
Assembly (2002)
Two Originals - Compilation (2003)
Storm (2006)
Forever Is the World (2009)
Addenda - EP (2010)

Singles
"Der Tanz der Schatten" (1996)
"Cassandra" (1998)
"Image" (2000)
"Machine" (2001)
"Let You Down" (2002)
"Envision" (2002)
"Storm" (2006)

With Imperium
Imperium - EP (1996, re-released 2004)

With Therion
Vovin (1998) - Hammond organ on "Draconian Trilogy"

External links
Lorentz Aspen at Theatre of Tragedy's official website

1978 births
Living people
Heavy metal keyboardists
Norwegian heavy metal musicians
Norwegian male pianists
Musicians from Stavanger
Theatre of Tragedy members